Stephanie Davis may refer to:

 Stephanie Davis (singer), American singer-songwriter, poet and musician
 Stephanie Davis, her 1993 self-titled album
 Stephanie Davis (actress) (born 1993), English actress
 Steph Davis (born 1973), American rock climber, BASE jumper and wingsuit flyer
 Stephanie D. Davis (born 1967), American judge
 Stephanie Davis (runner) (born 1990), British runner

See also
Steph Davies, cricketer